Cape Worsley is a dome-shaped cape 225 m high with snow-free cliffs on the south and east sides, lying 10 nautical miles (18 km) east of the south end of Detroit Plateau on Nordenskjöld Coast in Graham Land, Antarctica. Charted by the Falkland Islands Dependencies Survey (FIDS) in 1947 and named for Commander Frank A. Worsley, British polar explorer and member of Sir Ernest Shackleton's expeditions of 1914-16 and 1921–22.

Headlands of Graham Land
Nordenskjöld Coast